The E. H. Crump House is a historic house in Memphis, Tennessee, U.S.. It was built in 1909 for E. H. Crump, who went on to serve as the mayor of Memphis from 1910 to 1915. It was designed in the Colonial Revival architectural style, with Doric columns. It has been listed on the National Register of Historic Places since December 26, 1979. It is currently owned by Rhamy Alejeal and Elizabeth Alejeal, founders of People Processes.

References

Houses on the National Register of Historic Places in Tennessee
Colonial Revival architecture in Tennessee
Houses in Memphis, Tennessee